Pigs & T.V. is Violent Soho's debut extended play, released in 2006. Blunt Magazine gave it 8/10, saying "Sounding like The Vines fed on raw meat and produced on a fraction of the budget, Violent Soho are a boisterous pop rock combo from Brissyland reviving the spirit of the  grunge era."

Track listing

References

2006 debut EPs
EPs by Australian artists
Violent Soho albums